Cherie Jones (also known by her stage name JONES) is a British-based alternative pop singer and songwriter. She came into the music scene in 2015, with her debut extended play, entitled Indulge, and was so called after her debut single of the same name. Her debut album, entitled New Skin, was released on 7 October 2016. She said in a recent interview that she recognises herself to be similar to musicians Lykke Li and Yukimi Nagano.

Discography

Studio albums

EPs

Singles

as lead artist
 "Indulge" (2015)
 "Hoops" (2015)
 "Melt" (2016)
 "Indulge" (2016) 
 "Wild" (2016)
 "Whole" (2017)
 "Solid Gold" (2017) 
 "Simple" (2017) 
 "Something Bout Our Love" (2017)
 "Tender" (2018)
 "Giving It Up" (2020)
 "Around" (2021)

as featured artist
 "No Place Like Home" (2015) 
 "Solid Gold" (2016) 
 "Shock Horror" (2017) 
 "Handful of Gold" (2017) 
 "Apart" (2018) 
 "Ain't a Bad Thing" (2018)

References

Year of birth missing (living people)
Living people
British women singer-songwriters